The 2010–11 West Virginia Mountaineers men's basketball team represented West Virginia University in the 2010-11 NCAA Division I men's basketball season. They were coached by Bob Huggins and played their home games at the WVU Coliseum. They lost in the 2nd round by Marquette in the 2011 Big East men's basketball tournament. They were invited to the 2011 NCAA Division I men's basketball tournament. They defeated Clemson in the second round before losing to Kentucky in the third round.

Preseason

Recruiting

Roster

2010–11 Schedule

|-
!colspan=12 style=| Exhibition

|-
!colspan=12 style=| Regular season

|-
!colspan=12 style=| Big East tournament

|-
!colspan=12 style=| NCAA tournament

References

West Virginia Mountaineers
West Virginia Mountaineers men's basketball seasons
West Virginia
West Virginia Mountaineers men's basketball
West Virginia Mountaineers men's basketball